Krutaya Osyp is a rural locality (a settlement) in Vozhbalskoye Rural Settlement, Totemsky  District, Vologda Oblast, Russia. The population was 237 as of 2002.

Geography 
Krutaya Osyp is located 54 km northwest of Totma (the district's administrative centre) by road. Zakharovskaya is the nearest rural locality.

References 

Rural localities in Tarnogsky District